Bystročice is a municipality and village in Olomouc District in the Olomouc Region of the Czech Republic. It has about 800 inhabitants.

Administrative parts
The village of Žerůvky is an administrative part of Bystročice.

History
The first written mention of Bystročice is in a deed of bishop Jindřich Zdík from 1141.

References

Villages in Olomouc District